Rakesh Bedi is an Indian film, stage and television actor. He is known for his comic roles in films such as Mera Damaad and Chashme Buddoor (1981). He has also appeared in television shows like Yeh Jo Hai Zindagi (1984), Shrimaan Shrimati (1994-1997), Yes Boss (1999–2009) and Bechara Big B (2005).

Bedi is currently appearing in TV Sitcom as "Bhoorey Lal" in Bhabhi Ji Ghar Par Hain and as "Babulal" in Taarak Mehta Ka Ooltah Chashma.

Early life, education and family
Bedi completed his studies in Delhi. He went to Kendriya Vidyalaya in Andrewsganj, Delhi. His father Madan Gopal Bedi used to work with Indian Airlines. While Bedi was in school, he used to participate in Mono Acting competitions. Bedi has also worked with the New Delhi theatre group Pierrot's Troupe and studied acting at the Film and Television Institute of India, Pune.

Rakesh Bedi is married to Aradhana Bedi; and is father to Ridhima Bedi and Ritika Bedi.

Career
Bedi started his film career as a supporting actor in the 1979 film Hamare Tumhare, starring Sanjeev Kumar, and then went on to act in over 150 films and several TV serials. Some of his most memorable roles were in the 1981 film Chashme Buddoor with Farooq Shaikh and Ravi Baswani and Ek Duuje Ke Liye directed by K. Balachander and in the TV sitcoms Shrimaan Shrimati (1995), Yes Boss (1999-2009) as Mohan Srivastava, his one of best role and he is much appreciated for this and Yeh Jo Hai Zindagi (1984), written by Sharad Joshi and directed by Kundan Shah.

He hosted Science with BrainCafé, a science show on ZeeQ, and continues doing theatre in Mumbai. Notably, he played 24 different characters in Vijay Tendulkar's popular one-man play Massage. In 2012, he appeared on his first television drama daily soap, Shubh Vivah. Since 2015, he appears on television show Bhabi Ji Ghar Par Hai!.

Filmography

Film

Television

Web series

Dubbing roles

Live action films

Awards

References

External links

 
 

Living people
Indian male film actors
Indian male comedians
Male actors in Gujarati-language films
Male actors in Hindi cinema
Film and Television Institute of India alumni
Indian male television actors
Indian television presenters
Indian male stage actors
Male actors from New Delhi
20th-century Indian male actors
21st-century Indian male actors
1954 births